Zhao Benshan (born 2 October 1957) is a Chinese skit and sitcom actor,  comedian, television director, and businessman. Originally from Liaoning province, Zhao has appeared on the CCTV New Year's Gala, a widely watched performing arts program, every year from 1990 to 2011. Zhao's performances at the gala had made him a household name in China.

Zhao is also known for his lead roles in the 2000 Zhang Yimou film Happy Times and the 2007 film Getting Home, as well as having directed and produced three television series based around rural life in his home province, Liu Laogen, Ma Dashuai, and Xiangcun Aiqing ("Rural Love Story").

Biography
Zhao was born in Lianhua Village, Kaiyuan, Liaoning province, to a peasant family. He was orphaned at the age of 6. Apprenticed to his uncle, he learned many local traditional performance arts, including erhu, a traditional Chinese musical instrument, and Errenzhuan, a traditional style of stand-up comedy that involves two people talking to each other on the stage which is popular in northeastern China.

Jiang Kun, a nationally renowned xiangsheng artist, recommend Zhao to appear at the 1990 CCTV New Year's Gala, a TV program broadcast all over China to celebrate Chinese New Year. After his first appearance, he had appeared in each Gala show every year from 1995 to 2011. Zhao's skits focus on social issues, including wealth disparity, the urban-rural divide, family and relationships (guanxi), trust in society, and social changes in the era of economic reform.  His works often drew inspiration from his own life in rural northeastern China.

Zhao's most memorable performances have included "Yesterday, today and tomorrow" and "Fixing up the house" with Song Dandan, "Bainian" with Fan Wei and Gao Xiumin, a reprisal of "Yesterday, today, and tomorrow" with Song Dandan and Cui Yongyuan in 2006, and "Don't need money" in 2009 with Bi Fujian and Xiaoshenyang. Zhao became a household name in China since he began appearing at the Gala. His performances have generally received critical acclaim, earning the 'top-grade' prize for the "skits" category for thirteen years in a row between 1999 and 2011. Zhao's skit was almost always one of the most anticipated and talked-about events of the Gala.

Zhao has appeared as an actor in many films, including Zhang Yimou's Happy Times (2000) where he played an aging bachelor who really wanted to get married.

Zhao was also active in producing and directing several successful television series. He acted as the title character in the series Liu Laogen and Ma Dashuai, as well as a secondary character in Xiangcun Aiqing (lit. "Love in the Countryside") and their sequels.

Zhao was nominated for the Best Actor Award for his performance in Getting Home at the 2007 Golden Horse Awards, held in Taipei on 8 December 2007. He did not win, losing to Tony Leung for his work in Lust, Caution.

Zhao took part in the Beijing 2008 Summer Olympics torch relay by being a torchbearer in the Liaoning leg of the relay in Shenyang,  capital of Liaoning Province.

In 2009, Zhao was studying in the 4th intake CEO class at Cheung Kong Graduate School of Business. In September 2009, Zhao was in the news again following a cerebral aneurysm rupture. He was said to be in a stable condition after an operation, although close associates have mentioned that he often felt unwell in recent years when he is exhausted on the set.

Zhao's apprentice, Xiaoshenyang, performed in the 2009 and 2010 CCTV New Year's Galas. Zhao has not performed at the CCTV New Year's Gala since 2012, which has led to public speculation about his health and his conflict with 2012 gala director Ha Wen. 2012 was the first time since 1994 that he did not perform at the annual event.

Since mid-2014, Zhao Benshan has been dogged by rumours circulating on the internet about his possibly having been implicated in the anti-corruption campaign of Xi Jinping and Wang Qishan. Since the campaign began, Zhao's business ventures have seen a drop in profit.

Entrepreneurship
Zhao is an entrepreneur and has led many business ventures. Zhao Benshan performs at the residency show at the "Liulaogen Guild Hall". The  Hall is located in the Qianmen area of Beijing, just south of Tiananmen Square and is immersed in part in building compounds with a history of some 280 years. Zhao's show also tours in Shenyang, Changchun, Harbin and Jilin. Reportedly, these shows grossed over 100 million yuan (about US$14.64 million) in 2008.
 
In 2004, Zhao Benshan co-founded the Benshan Art Academy at Liaoning University, to nurture new Errenzhuan players. In 2005, he established Benshan Media Group, the parent company of Liaoning Folk Art Troupe, Benshan Production, Ruidong Culture Development Co. Ltd and Benshan Arts Academy.

In 2007, Zhao led his performing troupe to tour North America. They performed Errenzhuan in six cities including New York, Los Angeles and Vancouver.

Personal life
Zhao married Ge Shuzhen in 1979. Ge, a farmer from a village near Kaiyuan, was 19 at the time of their wedding. The two had a daughter, Yufang, and son, Tiedan, who had osteomalacia and emphysema as well as heart problems. Zhao and Ge divorced in 1992; Ge took custody of the children. Zhao reportedly made a lump-sum child support and medical expenses payment to his ex-wife and left with the intent of a 'clean break'. Ge Shuzhen worked a series of menial labour jobs after their divorce before becoming an entrepreneur. His son Tiedan died in 1994 at the age of 12. His daughter Yufang and her husband are reportedly local restaurateurs.

In 1992, Zhao married his second wife, Ma Lijuan, a Hui Chinese woman from Chifeng, Inner Mongolia. In 1997 the couple had fraternal twins named Zhao Yinan and Zhao Yihan. Singaporean Chinese-language newspaper Zaobao reported in 2014 that Ma Lijuan resided in Singapore along with their two children who were going to school in the country; the story broke after Ma reportedly successfully sued a local car dealership over a Porsche she purchased.

On September 30, 2009, it was reported Zhao had suffered a cerebral hemorrhage and was sent to hospital in Shanghai.

In December 2009, Zhao purchased a Bombardier Challenger 850 at a cost of 200 million yuan (US$30 million). He later stated that he was thinking of replacing the Challenger 850 with a newer Boeing or Gulfstream jet.

Politics
In 2014, Zhao was omitted from the guest list for a Liaoning arts conference and the Communist Party Central Committee's own exclusive arts conference in Beijing hosted by General Secretary Xi Jinping to "promote Chinese values". His missing both conferences led to speculation about Zhao having politically fallen 'out of line'. Chinese-language media has linked Zhao with disgraced politicians Bo Xilai and Wang Lijun, both of whom spent a large part of their careers in Zhao's home province, Liaoning.

In an exclusive interview with Shanghai-based news portal The Paper, the reporter asked if Zhao had become "too political". Zhao said "If you are not politically engaged, do not believe in our Party, why do you engage in art? You do not listen to our Party, why you still do art work?." In response to the Central arts conference, Zhao hosted his own "study sessions" to extol the virtues spoken about at the conference, during which Zhao said, "I have repeatedly read General Secretary Xi's speeches. I'm extremely emotional, extremely excited! Sometimes I cannot even sleep at night... we are living in times where we can dare to dream; a time with positive energy! The spring for performing arts is here!"

Filmography

Film 
 Don't Kidding Me (1987)
 Xian Shi Huo Bao (1990)
 Whoever Comes Is a Guest (1990)
 Keep Cool (1997) - Poet reader
 The Emperor and the Assassin (1999) - Gao Jianli
 Happy Times (2000) - Zhao
 Getting Home (2007)
 A Simple Noodle Story (2009)
 Just Call Me Nobody (2010)
 The Founding of a Party (2011) - Duan Qirui
 The Grandmasters (2012)
 The Lion Roars 2 (2012)
 Accidental Hero (2012)
 The New Year's Eve of Old Lee (2016)

Television 
 Liu Laogen - (2002), title character
 Ma Dashuai - (2004), title character
 Xiangcun Aiqing (2006−2019), recurring character

References

External links 
 
 

1957 births
Living people
Chinese company founders
Chinese entertainment industry businesspeople
Chinese male comedians
Chinese male film actors
Chinese male television actors
Chinese television directors
Male actors from Liaoning
Delegates to the 10th National People's Congress
Members of the 12th Chinese People's Political Consultative Conference
People from Tieling
Chinese male stage actors